Holili, is a town in Rombo District, Kilimanjaro Region, in northeastern Tanzania, at the border with Kenya.

Location
The coordinates of the town are: 3°22'49.0"S, 37°38'28.0"E (Latitude:-3.380269; Longitude:37.641117).

Overview
The town sits at the International border with Kenya, across from the town of Taveta, Kenya. The Holili/Taveta customs and immigration post is a One Stop Border Post.

See also
Taveta, Kenya
Kilimanjaro Region

References

External links
Webpage of the East African Community

Cities in the Great Rift Valley
Populated places in Kilimanjaro Region
Kenya–Tanzania border crossings